Kenneth Howell  (February 21, 1913 - September 28, 1966) was an American actor. He is best remembered for roles in films such as Pardon My Pups (1934), The Wrong Way Out (1938), Pride of the Bowery (1940) and Ball of Fire (1941), in which he played a college boy. He also played Jack Jones in the 17 low-budget Jones Family films, beginning with Every Saturday Night (1936) and ending with On Their Own (1940).

Howell was born in Los Angeles. He joined the Navy during World War II as a medical corpsman, but once he returned to the film business he was not able to revive his career. His last film role was In Old Amarillo (1951). Howell was married to Marguerite A. Thomson from 1942 to 1945, divorcing her after he realized he was gay. They had one daughter, Stephanie, born in September 1943, however, Howell did not remain in her life after 1948 when she was five years of age. His death at age 53, in Long Beach, California, resulted from a self-inflicted gunshot, reportedly a suicide.

Partial filmography

1933: The Ironmaster - Party Boy (uncredited)
1933: The Eagle and the Hawk - John Stevens
1933: Ladies Must Love - Messenger (uncredited)
1933: Saturday's Millions - Student (uncredited)
1934: Eight Girls in a Boat - Student (uncredited)
1934: Pardon My Pups (Short) - Harry Vanderpool
1934: I Give My Love - Frank Howard
1934: She Had to Choose - Announcer
1935: Old Man Rhythm - College Boy (uncredited)
1935: Annapolis Farewell - David David (uncredited)
1935: One Way Ticket - Boy (uncredited)
1936: The Little Red Schoolhouse - Schuyler Tree
1936: Every Saturday Night - Jack Evers
1936: Melody in May (Short) - Chuck Benton
1936: Educating Father - Jack Jones
1936: Back to Nature - Jack Jones
1936: Four Days' Wonder - Tom Fenton
1937: Off to the Races - Jack Jones
1937: A Star Is Born - Milton Rails (uncredited)
1937: The Jones Family in Big Business - Jack Jones
1937: Hot Water - Jack Jones
1937: Borrowing Trouble - Jack Jones
1938: Love on a Budget - Jack Jones
1938: A Trip to Paris - Jack Jones
1938: Safety in Numbers - Jack Jones
1938: Girls' School - Edgar
1938: Down on the Farm - Jack Jones
1938: The Wrong Way Out (Short) - Windy Brown
1939: Everybody's Baby - Jack Jones
1939: The Jones Family in Hollywood - Jack Jones
1939: Quick Millions - Jack Jones
1939: Too Busy to Work - Jack Jones
1940: Young as You Feel - Jack Jones
1940: On Their Own - Jack Jones
1940: Junior G-Men (Serial) - Harry Trent
1940: Pride of the Bowery - Alan
1941: Nice Girl? - Pete (uncredited)
1941: Her First Beau - Roger Van Vleck
1941: Hurry, Charlie, Hurry - Jerry Grant
1941: Henry Aldrich for President - Irwin Barrett
1941: Ball of Fire - College Boy
1942: Girls' Town - Kenny Lane
1942: Scattergood Rides High - Phillip Dane
1942: Sweater Girl - Miles Tucker
1942: Orchestra Wives - Teen Ager (uncredited)
1945: The Master Key (Serial) - Boys' Club Member (uncredited)
1951: In Old Amarillo - Phil Hills (final film role)

References

External links
 

American male film actors
1913 births
1966 deaths
Male actors from Los Angeles
20th-century American male actors
1966 suicides
United States Navy personnel of World War II
United States Navy corpsmen
American gay actors
Suicides by firearm in California